Irvin St. Clair Pepper (June 10, 1876December 22, 1913) was a Democratic U.S. Representative from Iowa's 2nd congressional district.

Pepper was born on a farm in Davis County, Iowa. He attended public schools and graduated from Southern Iowa Normal School at Bloomfield in 1897. He later served as principal of the Atalissa, Iowa High School and of the Washington School at Muscatine, Iowa.

He relocated to Washington, D.C. to serve as secretary for Democratic Congressman Martin J. Wade of Iowa's 2nd congressional district from 1903 to 1905. In 1905, he graduated from the George Washington University Law School, in Washington. He was admitted to the bar the same year and returned to Muscatine to commence practice. He served as prosecuting attorney of Muscatine County from 1906 to 1910.

In 1910, Pepper ran as a Democrat for an open seat in the U.S. House to represent Iowa's 2nd congressional district. He won the Democratic nomination, then defeated Republican Charles Grilk in the general election. He was then re-elected two years later with "little opposition."

On December 22, 1913, part way through his second term, Pepper died following an operation for infection of the gall bladder. He was recovering in Clinton County, Iowa, from typhoid fever, which had left him in a weakened state.

In the Sixty-third Congresses, he served as chairman of the Committee on Expenditures in the Post Office Department. He also served as a member of the House Committee on Military Affairs. At the time of his death, he served as secretary of the Democratic National Congressional Committee. In all, he served from March 4, 1911 until his death.

Pepper had planned to enter the contest in Iowa for the U.S. Senate seat held by Albert B. Cummins, in what would be Iowa's first direct election of a U.S. Senator.

He was interred in Shaul Cemetery, near Ottumwa, Iowa.

See also
List of United States Congress members who died in office (1900–49)

References

External links

"The lone duck in the brood," Jay "Ding" Darling editorial cartoon regarding Iowa's election of one Democrat (Pepper) to Congress in 1910, Iowa Digital Library.

1876 births
1913 deaths
Democratic Party members of the United States House of Representatives from Iowa
People from Davis County, Iowa
People from Bloomfield, Iowa
20th-century American politicians